Haikyu!! (ハイキュー!!) is a Japanese manga series written and illustrated by Haruichi Furudate. Individual chapters were serialized weekly in the shōnen manga anthology Weekly Shōnen Jump from February 2012 through July 2020. The ending in Chapter 402 was released in Weekly Shonen Jump Issue 33, 2020 on July 20, 2020. The series was initially published as a one-shot in Shueisha's seasonal Jump NEXT! magazine prior to serialization. As of November 2020, forty-five volumes have been released in Japan.

A spin-off titled , illustrated by Kyōhei Miyajima, was released in Shueisha's Shonen Jump+ website on May 13, 2019. Volumes 2 and 3, along with Volume 43 of the original manga, were set to be released on May 1, 2020 but was delayed to May 13, 2020 due to COVID-19 concerns. Nine volumes have been published as of January 2023.


Volume list

References

Haikyu!!
Haikyu!!